The 2013 National Premier Leagues was the inaugural season of the Australian National Premier Leagues football competition. It began on 22 February 2013 and concluded on 13 October 2013. The National Premier Leagues was contested by clubs from five divisions. The divisions were ACT, NSW, Queensland, South Australia and Tasmania. The winners of each respective divisional league then competed in a finals playoff tournament at season end, culminating in a grand final.

Sydney United 58 were crowned National Premier Leagues Champions.

League tables

ACT

Finals

NSW

Finals

Queensland

Finals

South Australia

Finals

Tasmania

Finals

Results

ACT

NSW

Queensland

South Australia

Tasmania

Final Series
The winner of each league competition (top of the table) in the NPL (with the exception of South Australia, where their entrant was the winner of the Finals series) played each other in a final knockout tournament to decide the National Premier Leagues Champion for 2013.

The participants were matched up based on geographical proximity, as if the three Federations not participating that season (Northern NSW Football, Football Federation Victoria and Football West) were doing so.  Where a team would have played a non-participating Federation that team received a bye to the next round.  The series was played over three rounds using a single match home or away knock-out format.

Quarter-finals

Notes:
 Byes to Campbelltown City, Olympic and South Hobart.

Semi-finals

Grand final

Individual honours
Glen Trifiro of Sydney United 58 received the John Kosmina Medal for best player in the NPL grand final.

References

External links
 Official website

National Premier Leagues seasons
2013 domestic association football leagues
2013 in Australian soccer